This timeline of the history of piracy in the 1670s is a chronological list of key events involving pirates between 1670 and 1679.

Events

1670
John Wentworth is appointed colonial governor of Nassau.
June - After the signing of the Treaty of Madrid, in which Great Britain agrees to cease its privateering activities against Spain, ending British support for buccaneering raids against the Spanish. Local colonial governors such as Thomas Modyford of Jamaica reluctantly cease issuing "letters of marque".
December - In spite of a direct order from Thomas Modyford not to engage in hostilities against the Spanish, Captain Henry Morgan begins organizing a group of English and French buccaneers to raid the Spanish stronghold of Panama City. His fleet, which included 1,800 men, sailed from Port Royal  as an advance force captured Fort San Lorenzo guarded the Chagres River. Travelling up the river by canoe, Morgan and his 1,200 men crossed the isthmus of Panama to attack Panama City within several weeks.

Deaths
Manuel Ribeiro Pardal, Portuguese pirate active in the Caribbean during the late 1660s.
Christina Anna Skytte

See also
Timeline of piracy

References

Piracy
Piracy by year